John Edward Cassidy, Sr. (January 31, 1896 – March 25, 1984) was an American lawyer.

Born in Ottawa, Illinois, Cassidy received his law degree from the University of Notre Dame in 1917 and was admitted to the Illinois bar the same year. Cassidy served in the United States Army in Europe during World War I. In 1920, Cassidy moved to Peoria, Illinois to head the legal department of Aetna Life Insurance Company. In 1921, he set up his own law firm in Peoria. Cassidy was involved with the Democratic Party. In 1936, he ran unsuccessfully for the party's nomination for lieutenant governor of Illinois. Cassidy was appointed Illinois Attorney General in 1938 and served until 1941. In 1947, Illinois Governor Dwight Green appointed Cassidy to be chairman of a citizens committee to investigate the March 25, 1947 mine disaster in Centralia, Illinois. Cassidy died in a hospital in Peoria, Illinois.

Notes

1896 births
1984 deaths
Politicians from Peoria, Illinois
People from Ottawa, Illinois
Notre Dame Law School alumni
Illinois lawyers
Illinois Democrats
Illinois Attorneys General
20th-century American politicians